Silvano Garay Ulloa (born 10 February 1959) is a Mexican politician from the Labor Party. From 2006 to 2009 he served as Deputy of the LX Legislature of the Mexican Congress representing the State of Mexico.

References

1959 births
Living people
Politicians from San Luis Potosí
Labor Party (Mexico) politicians
21st-century Mexican politicians
People from Matehuala
Autonomous University of Nuevo León alumni
Deputies of the LX Legislature of Mexico
Members of the Chamber of Deputies (Mexico) for the State of Mexico